Intraspecific breeding is sexual reproduction within a species. It can refer to:

 Selective breeding of plants or animals by humans, to choose desirable traits 
 Hybridization, when both parents are members of the same species

See also
 Breeding (disambiguation)